Prafulla Chandra College is an undergraduate college in South Kolkata, India. It is affiliated with the University of Calcutta.

About college
It is the evening section of South City College, which is officially known as Heramba Chandra College. It is not to be confused with another college named on the same person
the great Bengali academician, scientist and entrepreneur Acharya Prafulla Chandra Roy, called Prafulla Chandra College, and is affiliated with the University of Calcutta. Located in a very fashionable part of South Kolkata, easily accessible by frequently available railway services and other modes of public transport system from all parts of the city as well as suburbs, it is currently a government-aided co-educational evening college with huge infrastructural facilities.

See also 
List of colleges affiliated to the University of Calcutta
Education in India
Education in West Bengal

References

External links
prafullachandracollege.ac.in

University of Calcutta affiliates
Universities and colleges affiliated with the Brahmo Samaj
Educational institutions established in 1954
1954 establishments in West Bengal